Planismus floridanus is a species of beetle in the family Silvanidae, the only species in the genus Planismus.

References

Silvanidae